The 1978 season of the Venezuelan Primera División, the top category of Venezuelan football, was played by 12 teams. The national champions were Portuguesa.

Results

First stage

Final Stage

External links
Venezuela 1978 season at RSSSF

Ven
Venezuelan Primera División seasons
Prim